Golzar (also Romanized as Golzār) is a village in Esperan Rural District, in the Central District of Tabriz County, East Azerbaijan Province, Iran. At the 2006 census, its population was 63, in 18 families.

References 

Populated places in Tabriz County